Farnham Common is a village in Buckinghamshire, England, 3 miles north of Slough and 3 miles south of Beaconsfield, on the A355 road. It adjoins the ancient woodland of Burnham Beeches, has an area of 2.5 miles and a population of around 6,000. It is in the civil parish of Farnham Royal.

History

Farnham Royal was the main village with its church of St Mary's, shops, cottages and village pump situated in the centre junction of the cross roads. Farnham Common was known as 'Up End', being the common land of the parish where the livestock was grazed at certain times of the year. As this common area became more populated it became known as Farnham Common.

Farnham Common is on the border of Burnham Beeches, the well known Beech forest owned by the City of London Corporation, having been given to the people of London as a place in the country for their recreation and pleasure. In the 1920s it was very common for coach loads of Londoners to come down for the day at weekends having tea at the tea rooms and enjoying the donkey rides.

A few of the large old houses still remain such as Yew Place, Farnham Park House and the home of Caldicott. Yew Place was formerly known as The Rectory, part of which dates back to the time of King John. The original farmhouse was given to a coachman in the service of the Earl of Warwick. The Chase, now known as Farnham Park House, was owned by Mr Carr Gomme, a very influential member of the community, being one of the main organisers of fund-raisers for the building of St John's Church. The house passed into the hands of Sir Gomer Berry, later Lord Kemsley, who had the organ dismantled from Farnham Park House and gave it to St John's Church. In 1948 Farnham Park house became the Farnham Park Rehabilitation Centre, a renowned sports injury hospital owned by the East Berkshire Health Authority until its closure in 1988. In 1996 Farnham Park House was re-established as a private residence.

Caldicott is large house situated on the edge of Burnham Beeches and was once owned by Mrs Harvey who gave money for the extension of Farnham Common Village Hall. Caldicott is now a boys' preparatory school.

A few names of note who have been associated with Farnham Common have been the artist Rex Whistler's mother, who lived in The Small House in Burnham Beeches; J. M. Barrie, the author of Peter Pan and Enid Blyton, the children's author. In Burnham Beeches there is a large beech tree under which Felix Mendelssohn used to sit and compose some of his works in 'peaceful splendour'. Joan Hammond, the opera singer, lived in the part of the village known as Egypt. The Moore family live in the village and hold the record of three generations of one family representing Great Britain in the Olympic Games, Major George Moore having competed in 1948, Lieut. Col. John Moore, his son, in 1956, 1960 and 1964 and Lieut. Mark Moore, his grandson, in 1984. Lieut. Col. John Moore received on O.B.E. for his services to skiing. Lois Allan invented Fuzzy Felt in her cottage in the village during World War II.

More recently, Burnham Beeches has been used as a film set for some of the Harry Potter films, including the Order of the Phoenix and the Deathly Hallows Part 2.

Facilities

A small high street with facilities including:

 Sainsbury's Local
 Tesco Metro
 Lloyds Pharmacy
 Costa Coffee
 WHSmith Local
 The Cathcart Clinic - a multi-disciplinary pain clinic https://thecathcartclinic.com/
 Dental Practice
 Dry Cleaners
 La Cantina Del Vino - Italian restaurant
 Farnham Fisheries - Fish and Chips
 Duran's cafe - Bistro
 Black Cat Coffee Club
 Hairdressers
 Farnham Common Sports club (Squash, Cricket, Hockey, Rugby, Tennis & Fitness)

Pubs
 The Victoria
 Stag and Hounds
 The Foresters
 The Emperor
 The Crown Inn
 Royal Oak

Transport

Road
3 miles from M40 motorway Junction 2
4 miles from M4 motorway Junction 6
8 miles from M25 motorway Junction 16

Train
4 miles from Gerrards Cross railway station (18 mins to Marylebone station)
3.5 miles from Burnham railway station (Crossrail 42-50 mins to Bond Street - new timetable to improve speed and service from 20-May-2023)
4 miles from Slough railway station (Crossrail 39-46 mins to Bond Street - new timetable to improve speed and service from 20-May-2023)

Bus
No.X74 connecting High Wycombe, Farnham Common and Slough

Air
 20 min drive to Heathrow Airport
 35 min drive to Luton Airport
 50 min drive to Gatwick Airport
 1 hour drive to Stansted Airport

Utilities

Broadband
 BT Infinity FTTC Fibre Optic Broadband (available via multiple providers e.g. Plusnet, John Lewis, TalkTalk & Sky) up to 78mb
 Virgin Media FTTP Fibre Optic Broadband up to 1gb

Schools

Preparatory schools
 Caldicott School - Boys 7-13
 Dair House - Mixed 3-11

Grammar school catchment
Girls Grammar catchment map
Boys Grammar catchment map
 Beaconsfield High School - Ofsted rated Outstanding
 John Hampden Grammar School - Ofsted rated Outstanding
 Burnham Grammar School - Ofsted rated Good

State schools
 Farnham Common Infant School
 Farnham Common Junior School (for 2015 - 97% of pupils achieved level 4 or above in reading, writing and maths. Ranked #8 in Buckinghamshire in KS2 results)

Notable inhabitants
Johnny Ball - former children's television presenter
Bret Freeman - (Bret Hollywood) Professional Ring Announcer
Martin O'Neill – football manager
Dennis Waterman – actor
Paula Hamilton - former supermodel
Peter Lamont - Art Director
Alan Carr - comedian

Notable former inhabitants
Zoë Ball – radio DJ
Jimmy Carr – comedian
 Sir Peter Grain, former Chief Judge of the British Supreme Court for China
Ulrika Jonsson – television presenter
Roger Moore - actor
Phil Vickery – celebrity chef

References

External links

Villages in Buckinghamshire